This is a list of candidates of the 1947 New South Wales state election. The election was held on 3 May 1947.

Retiring Members
William McKell (Labor, Redfern) resigned in February 1947; no by-election was held due to the proximity of the election.

Labor
 Ted Horsington (Sturt)
 John Sweeney (Bulli)

Legislative Assembly
Sitting members are shown in bold text. Successful candidates are highlighted in the relevant colour.

See also
 Members of the New South Wales Legislative Assembly, 1947–1950

References
 

1947